Cyperus lecontei, commonly known as Le Conte's flatsedge, is a species of sedge that is native to south eastern parts of the United States.

See also
List of Cyperus species

References

lecontei
Plants described in 1854
Flora of Alabama
Flora of Florida
Flora of Louisiana
Flora of Mississippi
Flora of North Carolina
Flora of South Carolina
Taxa named by John Torrey